Tsuneonella aeria  is a Gram-negative and strictly aerobic bacterium from the genus Tsuneonella which has been isolated from air from the Xiangshan Mountain.

References

External links
Type strain of Altererythrobacter aerius at BacDive -  the Bacterial Diversity Metadatabase

Sphingomonadales
Bacteria described in 2016